Absolute Benson  is an enhanced studio album by American jazz musician George Benson. It was released by GRP and Verve Records on May 23, 2000 in the United States. Taking a tip from 1999's pop-man-of-the-year Carlos Santana, Benson goes Latin on this release.

Critical reception

AllMusic editor William Ruhlmann that Absolute Benson "is another in a series of consistently excellent CDs that characterize it [...] If it is difficult to crossover from jazz to pop, crossing back can be just as treacherous. Benson's oldest fans, who later became his detractors, still may not be satisfied with his current approach, but it has deservedly won him a secure place in contemporary jazz."

Track listing

Personnel and credits 
Musicians

 George Benson – guitar (1-9), vocals (1, 2, 8)
 Joe Sample – Hammond B3 organ (1, 2), Wurlitzer electric piano (1, 2), synthesizers (1, 2), acoustic piano (3-9), synthesizer arrangements 
 Ricky Peterson – Hammond B3 organ (8), synthesizers (8), synthesizer arrangements 
 Carlos Henríquez – bass (1, 2)
 Christian McBride – bass (3-9)
 Vidal Davis – drums (1, 2)
 Steve Gadd – drums (3, 4, 5, 7, 8)
 Cindy Blackman – drums (6, 9)
 Luisito Quintero – percussion (1, 2)
 Luis Conte – congas, percussion and timbales
 Arif Mardin – string arrangements (7)
 Claudia Acuña – backing vocals (1, 2)
 Roy Ayers – backing vocals (1)
 Lisa Fischer – backing vocals (1, 2)
 La India – backing vocals (1, 2)
 Richard Shade – backing vocals (1)

Production

 Producers – Tommy LiPuma (Tracks 1, 3-9); "Little" Louie Vega and Kenny "Dope" Gonzalez (Track 2).
 Recording Engineers – Steven Barkan and Jon Fausty (Tracks 1 & 2); Al Schmitt (Tracks 3-9).
 Assistant Engineers – Koji Egawa; Kayo Teramoto (Tracks 1 & 2); Mark Fraunfelder, Alan Moon and Aya Takemura (Tracks 3-9).
 Overdubs on Tracks 3-9 recorded by Bill Schnee and Tommy Tucker, assisted by Elliot Scheiner and Al Schmitt.
 Strings on Track 7 recorded by James Farber
 Mixing – Steven Barkan (Tracks 1 & 2); Bill Schnee (Tracks 3-9).
 Mastered by Doug Sax at The Mastering Lab (Hollywood, CA).
 Art Direction – Hollis King
 Photography – Jeffrey Scales and Kwaku Alston
 Graphic Design – Isabelle Wong

Charts

References 

George Benson albums
2000 albums
Albums produced by Tommy LiPuma
GRP Records albums
Verve Records albums